Asaia bogorensis is a species of acetic acid bacterium. It is Gram-negative, aerobic, rod-shaped and peritrichously flagellated. It was first isolated from specimens of Bauhinia purpurea and Plumbago auriculata. Its type strain is 71T (= NRIC 0311T = JCM 10569T). it is potentially pathogenic.

References

Further reading

SEDLÁČKOVÁ, Petra, et al. "Cell surface characteristic of Asaia bogorensis–spoilage microorganism of bottled water." Czech J. Food Sci. Vol 29.4 (2011): 457–461.

External links

LPSN

Rhodospirillales
Bacteria described in 2000